Babinavichy (also Babinavičy or Babinovichi) is a small town in Liozna District, in the Vitebsk Region of Belarus.

The town traditionally supplied timber for the Imperial Russian Navy, as is reflected in its coat-of-arms which depicts two masts.

The town was previously a Jewish shtetl situated in the Mogilev Governorate of the Russian Empire.

People
Chaya Mushka Schneerson (1901-1988), the daughter of Yosef Yitzchak Schneersohn (the 6th Chabad Rebbe) and wife of Menachem Mendel Schneerson (the 7th Chabad Rebbe), was born in Babinavichy on March 16, 1901.

References

External links
 The murder of the Jews of Babinavichy during World War II, at Yad Vashem website.

Populated places in Vitebsk Region
Liozna District
Vitebsk Voivodeship
Orshansky Uyezd
Shtetls
Jewish communities destroyed in the Holocaust